Białystok Voivodeship was an administrative unit of interwar Poland (1918–1939). The province's capital and its biggest city was Białystok with a population of over 91,000 people. Following the Nazi German and the Soviet invasion of Poland, the Voivodeship was occupied by both invading armies and divided according to Nazi-Soviet boundary treaty.

Area and location 

In interwar Poland (1918–1939), Bialystok Voivodeship was located in the country's mid-northern part. It bordered Germany (East Prussia) to the north-west, Lithuania to the north-east, Wilno Voivodeship and Nowogródek Voivodeship to the east, Polesie Voivodeship and Lublin Voivodeship to the south and Warsaw Voivodeship to the west. Its area was 26 036 km². The landscape was flat, with the mighty Bialowieza Forest located right in the middle.

Population 

Inhabited mostly by Poles (in 1931 they made up 66.9% of the population), it also had significant Belarusian (16.3%) and Jewish (12.1%) minorities. Interestingly, in 1931, 2.8% claimed Russian as their native tongue. The population, according to the 1931 Polish census was 1 263 300.

According to Polish data from April 1939, the population of Białystok voivodship was divided as follows: 71,1% Poles, 13,5%  Belarusians, 11,9% Jews, 2,2% Russians,  0,9% Lithuanians, 0,5% Germans.

History 

From 10 July 1930 to the end of February 1934, Marian Zyndram-Kościałkowski was the Voivode of Białystok. During this time, he streamlined administration, increased supervision of officials, and prioritised the development of sewers and streets in Bialystok. He also founded the Regional Committee for Unemployment, as well as had their share in the creation of the Agricultural Chamber of Białystok and ensuring the participation of entrepreneurs in the second Bialystok Fair Vilnius. He was also one of the founders of Jagiellonia Białystok Sports Club (of which he was honorary president of the club).

In November 1930, Marian Zyndram-Kościałkowski once again became a member of Parliament (he was 17th on the list of the Nonpartisan Bloc for Cooperation with the Government (BBWR).

In 1932, Zyndram-Kościałkowski remained at the disposal of the Head of the Department and the Ministry of Defense Corps.

Administrative divisions

Cities and towns 

The Voivodeship consisted of thirteen counties (powiaty):

According to the 1931 census, the most significant cities were:
Bialystok (pop. 91 100),
Grodno (pop. 49 700),
Suwalki (pop. 21 800),
Wolkowysk (pop. 15 100),
Augustow (pop. 12 100).

Railroads and industry 

In the interwar period, Białystok Voivodeship was part of the so-called "Poland B". This meant that it was underdeveloped, with 23.1% of the population being illiterate. Railroad networks were scarce (total length 1 377 km., density - 4.2 per 100 km²), and forested areas covered 24.4% of Voivodeship's area. The city of Białystok (whose population reached 107 000 in 1939), was the Voivodeship's lone industrial centre. Agriculture was at a low level.

Voivodes 
 Stefan Badzynski, 19 November 1919 – 18 October 1920
 Stefan Kołek, May 1920 – September 1920 (acting)
 Stefan Popielawski, September 1920 – 12 July 1924 (till 3 November 1920 - acting)
 Marian Rembowski, 12 August 1924 – 24 November 1927
 Karol Kirst, 24 November 1927 – 10 July 1930
 Marian Zyndram-Kościałkowski, 10 July 1930 – 8 March 1934
 Stanisław Michałowski, 8 March 1934 – 29 September 1934 (acting)
 Stefan Pasławski, 29 September 1934 – 14 July 1936
 Stefan Kirtiklis, 17 July 1936 – 9 September 1937
 Henryk Ostaszewski, 9 November 1937 – 10 September 1939 (till 22 December 1937 acting)

See also
 Białystok Voivodeship (1945–1975)
 Białystok Voivodeship (1975–1998)

Notes

References 
 Maly rocznik statystyczny, Warszawa 1939 (Concise Statistical Year-Book of Poland, Warsaw 1939). 

 
Former voivodeships of the Second Polish Republic
Western Belorussia (1918–1939)